Double gate or double gates is generally a pair of gates which open together.  It may also refer to the following:

One set of the Huldah Gates, a pair of sealed Gates of the Al Aqsa Compound.
Multigate device, a type of transistor
A type of locking mechanism in some carabiners

Two gates or Twin gates gate may refer to:
Two gate chips, a type of integrated circuit
Two Gates of Sleep, a 2010 film
Twin Gate, a 2010 album by Exist Trace
Open the Twin Gate Championship, a wrestling title

See also
Gate (disambiguation)